Ferrymead Heritage Park is a museum in Christchurch, New Zealand, housing groups with historical themes, mainly transport related. Formerly known as Ferrymead Historic Park, it was founded in 1964 by groups, local government bodies and other interested parties. It is in the Heathcote Valley, at the site of New Zealand's first public railway.

History

Museum of Science & Industry
This was the original name of the park. Groups came together in the early 1960s with a common interest in forming a museum of scientific and industrial history, including the Canterbury Branch of the New Zealand Railway and Locomotive Society, which had formed in the late 1950s to cater for local rail enthusiast interests. A pilot project was in Garvins Road, Hornby: their original proposed site was at Prebbleton, south-west of Christchurch. When that site became unavailable, interest was kindled at Ferrymead.

Ferrymead Trust

The Ferrymead Trust was incorporated in the late 1960s to represent the common interests of the societies. For many years its day-to-day activities were controlled by committees made up of members of some or all of its constituent groups. The Trust relied heavily on local and national government funding and much of its early building and construction work was carried out by unemployed relief workers in central government employment subsidy schemes. By the mid-1980s the structure of the Trust was seen as unwieldy, and reforms were implemented to bring a more businesslike approach to its operations, devolving day-to-day operations to appointed managers and representing society interests through a membership council.

The Trust continued to operate, but in the mid-1990s it had sustained heavy losses in the operation of the park, largely due to having a seven-day-per-week year-round operation with paid staff. As it appeared likely that the mortgagee would sell the park's assets, Christchurch City Council (CCC) assumed liability for the park's debt in return for hands-on management and the sale of various assets, including surplus land.

Ferrymead Park Ltd
The CCC identified as a major stumbling block the operation of the park by numerous independent societies. In response, Ferrymead Park Ltd was established in 1998, a not-for-profit company owned by the Ferrymead Trust. The park is now managed and operated by Ferrymead Park Ltd, and receives CCC core-funding. Ownership and control of the resources of the individual societies continues to be vested in these groups. During the company's tenure visitor numbers and turnover have increased, and Ferrymead has the 'Qualmark' tourism endorsement. The number of volunteer groups involved in the Park has also increased. Maintenance of the grounds and buildings is predominantly carried out by paid staff, enthusiastically assisted by the efforts of a small team of staff and service users of IDEA Services Ltd, a division of IHC, the largest national organisation providing support and advocacy for people with intellectual disabilities.

Member societies

The following societies are currently active:
 Canterbury Centre for Historic Photography & Film Inc.
 Canterbury Railway Society Inc. (operators of the  narrow gauge Ferrymead Railway)
 Diesel Traction Group Inc.
 Ferrymead Aeronautical Society Inc.
 Ferrymead Clydesdales Society Inc.
 Ferrymead Museum of Road Transport Inc.
 Ferrymead Post and Telegraph Historical Society Inc. (with display of early Rotary system automatic telephone exchange) 
 Ferrymead Printing Society Inc.
 Ferrymead Two Foot Railway Society Inc. (operators of the  narrow gauge Ferrymead Two Foot Railway)
 Fire Services Historical Society Inc.
 Friends of Ferrymead Fraternity Inc.
 Garden City Model Railroad Club Inc.
 Heathcote Studios Theatrical Society Inc.
 Heritage Youth Inc.
 Lions Club of Ferrymead Inc.
 Radio Preservation Society of New Zealand (Ferrymead) Inc. (Radio Ferrymead)
 Society of Rural History Inc.
 Tramway Historical Society Inc. (operators of the standard gauge Ferrymead Tramway

Other societies have come and gone, notably the Ferrymead Military Museum Society. Heathcote Studios Theatrical Society is the most recent member.

Geography
The park is in the Heathcote Valley. Being close to the sea and low-lying, it was historically subjected to frequent flooding. A major event was the "Wahine Storm" of 1968, in which a large part of the site, then in embryonic development, was under water. This is no longer a major issue due to the filling of large parts of the site. Since the active involvement of the CCC began in the mid-1990s, flood and stormwater management have been implemented in the park and surrounding lands. The major project of the Heathcote Valley Park aims to integrate these along with the development of wildlife habitat areas and native plantings.

In the days of being managed by the Heathcote County Council, prior to local government amalgamation of 1989, part of the site was used as a rubbish dump. The raised location known as "Woods Hill" was formed artificially by the large-scale compacting of refuse dumped there over a number of years. This area is rather unstable land and buildings constructed there without appropriate foundations have been damaged by subsidence. The Tamaki Brothers of Rotorua received substantial CCC assistance to construct a tourist Māori village on the site, which opened in 2007.

Radio Ferrymead

Radio Ferrymead is a radio station operated by the Radio Preservation Society (RPS) in Christchurch, New Zealand. The RPS is a non-profit incorporated society based at the Ferrymead Heritage Park, whose aim is to collect, preserve and display radio and radio related historical items. The station normally broadcasts from Friday 8.00am through until Monday midnight and from 8.00am to 6.00pm during Statutory and Christmas/New Year Holidays. The studio is open to the public on weekends between 10.00 am to 4.30 pm. Live broadcasts are done by volunteers during daytime and automated music plays at night.

The station broadcasts a mix of historical musical recordings from dancebands, stage, screen, radio and television covering music from the 1930s to the 1980s. The station transmits on 1413 kHz AM at 900W from a nearby aerial, and its historic call sign was 3XP. The station plays music from 78rpm recordings as well as vinyl LPs and 45s, compact discs, cassette tapes, reel-to-reel tapes and automated mp3 music on computer.

See also
List of New Zealand railway museums and heritage lines

References

External links

The Canterbury Railway Society
Tramway Historical Society

 
Buildings and structures in Christchurch
Museums in Christchurch
Open-air museums in New Zealand
Railway museums in New Zealand
Tramways with double-decker trams